USS Rendova (CVE-114) was a  of the United States Navy.

She was originally assigned the name Mosser Bay she was laid down by Todd-Pacific Shipyards, Inc., Tacoma, Washington, 15 June 1944; launched 29 December 1944; sponsored by Mrs. Anna-Marie H. Kurtz; and commissioned 22 October 1945, Capt. R. W. Ruble in command. She was completed at Willamette Iron and Steel Works.

Operational history
Rendova, named after the landings on Rendova, completed shakedown in early January 1946, and reported for duty with the 1st Fleet in February. During March, she conducted exercises off the west coast, but in April, her complement was reduced to a maintenance crew. Immobilized at San Diego for a year, she remained on the active list as the administrative headquarters for Carrier Division 15 (CarDiv 15). In the spring of 1947, she returned to full active duty and for the next year conducted training exercises off the west coast and in the Hawaiian Islands.

On 1 April 1948, she departed San Francisco en route to Turkey with a cargo of AT-6 training planes for that country's air force. Steaming via the Panama Canal, she arrived at Yesilkoy 28 April, off loaded her cargo, and continued her voyage 4 May. She moved south to Suez, thence crossed the Indian and Pacific Oceans. With numerous good will visits en route, she returned to San Diego 1 July, only to depart again on another mission, this time to Tsingtao, on the 28th. At Tsingtao 23 – 27 August, she was back in San Diego, her homeport, in late September and through the fall trained on the west coast. With the new year, 1949, she again sailed west; operated between Tsingtao and Okinawa until mid-April; then returned to her homeport and resumed 1st Fleet training operations. In October, she arrived at Bremerton, where, after overhaul, she was decommissioned, 27 January 1950, and berthed with the Pacific Reserve Fleet.

Rendova and crew were present for two nuclear tests during Operation Ivy. The official names of the test were Ivy Mike and Ivy King. Crew were subjected to minimal exposure, officially rated to be .02 rem gamma total. The blasts were held near Eluklab Island. Rendova was present for both atmospheric and ground testing. These tests were the first ever successful detonations of hydrogen bombs.

Korean war
Six months later the North Korean Army crossed the 38th Parallel and Rendova was ordered activated. Recommissioned 3 January 1951, she reported for duty in April and on 3 July steamed west. She arrived at Yokosuka 2 August; underwent further training off Okinawa; then on 20 September, arrived at Kobe to relieve  as part of CTG 95.1.

On the 22nd, she completed embarking personnel, planes (F4Us), and equipment of Marine Fighter Squadron (VMF) 212. On the 23rd, she conducted carrier qualifications for the squadron. On the 24th, she loaded ammunition and supplies at Sasebo and on the 25th, she got underway for operating area "Nan" in the Yellow Sea. There she relieved  assuming CTE 95.11, and on the 26th, launched her first close air support sortie. VMF-212 recorded 1,743 sorties in support of ROK, U.S. Marine, and EUSAK ground forces; enforcing the U.N. blockade; rendering SAR assistance; and flying armed and photo reconnaissance missions. On 17 November, the ship and the squadron established a new sortie record for CVEs – 64.

Rendova completed her last support operation 6 December. By the 22nd, she was back at San Diego and with the new year, 1952, she resumed west coast training operations with the 1st Fleet. In September, she sailed west again and for two months participated in Operation "Ivy" – an atomic test series in the Marshalls, then she returned to California.

In commission, in reserve in 1953, she continued her training activities off the west coast, and in 1954 returned to the active fleet and another WestPac deployment, this time as a hunter-killer carrier. Back in California by mid-June, she conducted exercises out of Long Beach until October, then shifted to Mare Island for preinactivation overhaul. She reported to the Pacific Reserve Fleet, San Francisco Group, 2 February 1955 and was decommissioned 30 June. Reclassified AKV-14 in 1959, she remained in the Reserve Fleet until struck from the Navy list 1 April 1971.

Rendova earned two battle stars for Korean war service.

References 

 

Commencement Bay-class escort carriers
1944 ships
Cold War aircraft carriers of the United States
Korean War escort carriers of the United States
Korean War aircraft carriers of the United States